Aslanbek Inalovich Yenaldiev (18 December 1947 – 30 May 2015) was a Ossetian-Russian superheavyweight weightlifter. In 1977 he won silver medals at the European and world championships, as well as a Soviet title.

In retirement Yenaldiev continued competing in arm wrestling and trained weightlifters in his native Ossetia. He was married and had three daughters.

References

1947 births
2015 deaths
Ossetian people
Soviet male weightlifters
European Weightlifting Championships medalists
World Weightlifting Championships medalists